Ivan Chaikivskyi (born May 29, 1972) is a Ukrainian businessman and politician. He was conferred the "For Work and Victory" (2008) medal. Knight of the "Order of Merit" III degree (2012). He served as a People's Deputy of Ukraine of the 9th convocation. He was a member of the deputy group "For the Future".

Early life 
He was born in the village of Nastasiv, Ternopil Raion, Ternopil Oblast.

He graduated from Ternopil Vocational School № 10 (1990, specialty "Construction"). From 1990 to 1992 he served in the Armed Forces of Ukraine. In 2009 he received a master's degree in economics and investment management from Ternopil National University of Economics.

Career 
He was the chairman of the board of the Association of Owners "Kolos" (Nastasiv village, Ternopil region), and headed the company "Agroprodservice".

In 2010, he became the deputy of the Ternopol Raion Rada.

He served as vice-chairman of the Agrarian Party of Ukraine. From 2016 he headed the regional organization of the Agrarian Party in Ternopil.

He was Secretary of the Committee on Agrarian Policy and Land Relations at the Verkhovna Rada of Ukraine of the 9th convocation (elected on August 29, 2019).

He is married and has a daughter and a son.

References

Sources 
 
 Чайківський Іван Адамович // Lb.ua, June 11, 2020.

Living people
1972 births
21st-century Ukrainian businesspeople
Ninth convocation members of the Verkhovna Rada
People from Ternopil Oblast
Ternopil National Economic University alumni